The International Auditing and Assurance Standards Board (IAASB) is an independent standards body that issues standards, like the International Standards on Auditing, quality control guidelines, and other services, to support the international auditing of financial statements. It is a body supported by the International Federation of Accountants (IFAC).
The Public Interest Oversight Board provides oversight of the IAASB, ensuring that the standards are in the public interest.

To further ensure proposed standards are in the public interest the IAASB consults its Consultative Advisory Group, which is composed of standard setters, various international organizations from the private and public sectors, and regulators. Representatives include a balance of users and prepares of financial statements, and should to the extent practicable be balanced geographically. 

Founded in March 1978 as the International Auditing Practices Committee (IAPC), the IAASB's current strategic objectives include:

 Increase the emphasis on emerging issues to ensure that the IAASB International Standards provide a foundation for high-quality audit, assurance and related services engagements
 Innovate the IAASB’s ways of working to strengthen and broaden our agility, capabilities, and capacity to do the right work at the right time
 Maintain and deepen relationships with stakeholders to achieve globally relevant, progressive and operable standards

See also
 International Organization of Supreme Audit Institutions
 International Public Sector Accounting Standards

References

External links
 

International accounting organizations
Auditing standards
International standards